John Strehlow (born 1946) is an Australian stage director, playwright, and author. He is known for his workThe tale of Frieda Keysser: Frieda Keysser & Carl Strehlow, an historical biography, about his grandparents, Lutheran missionaries Carl and Frieda Strehlow, who served for many years at Hermannsburg Mission in the Northern Territory.

Early life 
Strehlow was born in 1946 in Adelaide, South Australia, into a family closely involved with Aboriginal people for three generations. His parents are Ted and Bertha Strehlow and his paternal grandparents are Carl and Frieda Strehlow.

Strehlow received his early education from Adelaide Boys' High School from 1958 to 1963, and while at school he studied piano, clarinet and, later, the organ. As an organist he Organ Music Society of Adelaide competition in 1962. 

Strehlow studied Classics at the University of Adelaide from 1964 to 1966 before changing to Modern European and Asian History in 1967, from which he graduated with honours in 1969. His thesis analysed Mahatma Gandhi's use of tradition to further the Indian independence movement. In these university years Strehlow also reviewed theatre and film and, from 1968 until graduation, he ran the student film society there. 

Following graduation Strehlow spent six months in India, staying mostly in Calcutta, and spent short periods in Pakistan, Afghanistan, and Iran.

Career 
From 1970 to 1972 Strehlow taught drama in South Australia, and during this period he met and established relationships with many Pitjantjatjara people and groups from the Flinders Ranges. It is because of this that Strehlow decided to learn the Pitjantjatjara language, and undertook a course at the University of Adelaide under Bill Edwards. From 1972 to 1975 Strehlow lived in Alice Springs, where he established a clothing business. 
 
In 1975 Strehlow left Alice Springs after receiving a grant from the Australian Schools Commission to tour theatre and run workshops in all NT towns, as well as 12 Aboriginal settlements, performing to all age groups under a wide range of conditions for six months. A big reason for Strehlow doing this was to try to understand the predicament of Central Australia and the plight of the Aboriginal peoples living in the communities round Alice Springs, which so many of his family had devoted their lives to doing.

In 1976 Strehlow returned to Adelaide, where he established a theatre company which would travel the world and perform to more than 300 theatres in the United Kingdom, Germany, the Netherlands, Belgium, Switzerland, and Italy. Of the more than 50 productions performed, specialising in Shakespeare's plays, four were written by Strehlow: Ali Baba; Revolution's Son; The Slaying of the Dragon King; and The Elusive Reality. During this period, for almost 30 years, Strehlow based himself in London.

In addition to writing plays, Strehlow has written for newspapers and magazines, given interviews for radio and television, and acted as an adviser for numerous cultural institutions holding materials relating to Aboriginal Australians.In 2000 he contributed to Mr Strehlow's Films (directed by Hart Cohen), a documentary film based around the work of his father Ted Strehlow. 

In the 1990s Strehlow became increasingly curious about the lives of his grandparents, Carl and Frieda Strehlow after discovering the existence of Frieda's diaries, written in old script German, in Berlin and the realisation that this personal record of her life in Hermannsburg, from 1897 and 1908 which revealed previously unknown details of their lives their and happenings in the community and more generally around Central Australia. Strehlow began work on what would become a two-volume set in 1994, and the final volume was published, in two parts, in 2019; the launch was held at The Residency in Alice Springs on 17 December 2019. At this launch Ted Egan said that Strehlow had "contributed monumentally to the historic records of the NT" and that this work "will be of benefit to all scholars".

Strehlow records these stories in the first person, saying:

Research for this work took Strehlow to more than 50 archives in the UK, Germany and Australia and rests not only on Freida's diaries, but other untapped sources only published in German (which Strehlow learnt for this purpose). The ultimate result includes a detailed record of day-to-day life at Hermannsburg, the forming of stations in the area, the survival of the Arrernte and Luritja people in the area, and the pressure the missionaries faced.

Publications 
 The tale of Frieda Keysser:  Frieda Keysser & Carl Strehlow, an historical biography; Volume 1 / by John Strehlow.
 The tale of Frieda Keysser:  Frieda Keysser & Carl Strehlow, an historical biography, between three worlds,1910-1922; Volume 2 / by John Strehlow.

References 

1946 births
Living people
People from the Northern Territory
20th-century Australian writers
Australian dramatists and playwrights
People educated at Adelaide High School
University of Adelaide alumni
Australian people of German descent